The M27 link, formally Link, Cartridge, Metallic Belt, 5.56mm, M27 is a metallic disintegrating link issued by the United States armed forces and among NATO and designed for use in belt-fed firearms. It holds 5.56×45mm NATO ammunition.

History
The first scaled-down version of the mid-20th century M13 link was developed in the early 1960s for the Stoner 63 belt-fed light machine gun/squad automatic weapon and designated as the "S-63 BRW" link.
In the early 1970s this scaling-down concept was further developed. The resulting modified link had a slightly different angle of pitch and was adapted as the M27 link for use with the FN Minimi/M249 SAW.
The M27 link is used on the FN Minimi/M249, HK23, MG4, CETME Ameli, K3, Mini-SS and Negev, among others.

Design details
Each M27 link consists of a single piece of metal curved into two partial cylinders, into which adjacent rounds slide. Like the M13 link, the M27 link is a push-through design. Rounds are extracted by pushing forward out of the link. With the round freed, the link disintegrates (detaches from the belt) and is ejected. This is in contrast with older belt systems which were typically made of fabric and were fed straight through the weapon without disintegrating.

The links often have an extra anti-corrosion surface treatment, generally (oil impregnated) black phosphate, and can be collected and reassembled by hand with fresh ammunition, but in practice this is not commonly done as it is labor-intensive, and the inexpensive links are considered disposable.

See also
M1 link
M13 link

References
 

 M27 link technical data

Firearm components
Ammunition
Military equipment introduced in the 1970s